Amaury IV of Craon (16 August 1326 – 30 May 1373), Lord of Craon, Chantocé, Ingrandes, Briollé, Châteauneuf-sur-Sarthe, Précigné and Sablé , Sainte-Maure, Nouâtre, Pressigny and Marcillac, Châteauneuf-sur-Charente and Jarnac, was a French noble, who was part of the Hundred Year's War.

Biography 
Born on 16 August 1326, Croan was the son of Maurice VII de Craon and Marguerite de Mello. The Croan family held the hereditary office of Seneschal of Anjou and Maine.

He married in 1345 Péronelle, Viscountess of Thouars and Countess of Dreux, with whom he had no issue. He is known to have had two illegitimate children, Pierre, and Jeannette who married Thibaut de La Devillière.

Created royal lieutenant in 1347 by King Philip IV, Amaury was sent to Brittany with a small force and took La Roche-Derrien from the English in three days. In 1356, after being besieged at Romorantin in late August during the Chevauchée of the Black Prince, and ransomed, Amaury was taken prisoner at the Battle of Poitiers on the 19 September. Craon became one of the main captains of King John II of France and becomes Captain for Touraine, Anjou, Maine and Lower Normandy. Amaury is later influenced by the Poitou lords who are favourable to King Edward III of England and eventually joins them at the head of the Anglo-Poitevin coalition, facing Bertrand du Guesclin who is attempting to regain Poitou on behalf of King Charles V of France.

Du Guesclin defeats the English garrisons at Bressuire, Poitiers, Châtellerault, Saint-Maixent-l'École, Fontenay-le-Comte then arrives in at Thouars in June 1372 with an army of thirty thousand soldiers. In addition to Amaury, the main leaders of the pro-English lords, Guillaume VII of Parthenay, Geoffroy d'Argenton, the Lords of Oyron and Airvault, Perceval de Coulanges are holed up within the fortifications of Thouars. The direct attack of the French army having failed, Du Guesclin brings siege engines to the walls of the city. A breach is opened in the walls but the besieged manage to repel the attackers. A suspension of the siege is concluded and if Thouars is not relieved by Saint-Michel the town would surrender to the French. The town capitulate and the leaders take the oath of fealty to Charles V.

Amaury died on 30 May 1373 and was buried in the church of Cordeliers, Angers.

References

Sources

1326 births
1373 deaths
Craon family